U-158 may refer to one of the following German submarines:

 , the lead ship of the Type U 158 submarines; launched in 1918 during World War I; unfinished at the end of the war; broken up incomplete
 , a Type IXC submarine that served in World War II until sunk on 30 June 1942

Submarines of Germany